Gritsayevka is a rural locality (a khutor) in Dedovsky Selsoviet, Fyodorovsky District, Bashkortostan, Russia. The population was 29 as of 2010. There is 1 street.

Geography 
Gritsayevka is located 18 km southwest of Fyodorovka (the district's administrative centre) by road. Yurkovka is the nearest rural locality.

References 

Rural localities in Fyodorovsky District